Luke Alan Croll (born 10 January 1995) is an English professional footballer who plays as a defender for USL League One side North Carolina FC.

Club career

Crystal Palace 
Croll was born in Lambeth and joined the Crystal Palace Academy as a 9 year old. The left-sided centre half put in a series of consistent performances for the under-21 side to earn himself a professional contract at the club, and went onto firmly establish himself in the side that won the U21 League 2 South in the 2014-15 season. In the 2015-16 season, Croll was named as an unused substitute against Watford. Croll was released by Crystal Palace on the expiry of his contract on 30 June 2017.

2013–14 Harrow Borough (loan)

In January 2014, Croll joined Isthmian League side Harrow Borough on a short-term loan. Croll made 2 league appearances  before returning to the Crystal Palace Development side.

2015–16 Plymouth Argyle (loan)

On 20 November 2015, Croll joined Plymouth Argyle on loan until 2 January 2016.

2016–17 Exeter City (loan)
On deadline day, Croll joined Exeter City on loan until 14 January 2017. The loan period was later extended until the end of the 2016–17 season.

Exeter City
In June 2017, Croll signed a permanent deal with Exeter after being released by Crystal Palace.

He was released by Exeter at the end of the 2018–19 season.

Dagenham & Redbridge
In July 2019 he signed for National League side Dagenham & Redbridge on a one-year contract. He was released by Dagenham along with five others in June 2021 following the expiration of his contract.

Chesterfield
On 6 November 2021, Croll joined National League side Chesterfield on a short-term deal. He made his debut later that day, making an impressive debut that saw him score as Chesterfield defeated Southend United in the FA Cup First Round.

North Carolina FC
On 2 February 2023, Croll signed with North Carolina FC of the USL League One, the third-tier of US soccer.

Career statistics

References

External links

Living people
1995 births
English footballers
Footballers from Lambeth
Association football defenders
Crystal Palace F.C. players
Plymouth Argyle F.C. players
Harrow Borough F.C. players
Exeter City F.C. players
Dagenham & Redbridge F.C. players
Chesterfield F.C. players
North Carolina FC players
English Football League players
Isthmian League players
National League (English football) players
English expatriate footballers
English expatriate sportspeople in the United States
Expatriate soccer players in the United States